Lamb Chopz is the fifth extended play by Esham A. Smith, released as a digital download. The EP's six tracks were incorporated into the 2008 mixtape The Butcher Shop.

Track listing

References

2007 EPs
Albums produced by Esham
Esham EPs
Reel Life Productions EPs